Call of Duty: Black Ops Cold War is a 2020 first-person shooter video game developed by Treyarch and Raven Software and published by Activision. It was released worldwide on November 13, 2020, for PlayStation 4, PlayStation 5, Windows, Xbox One, and Xbox Series X/S. It serves as the sixth installment in the Black Ops series and the seventeenth installment in the overall Call of Duty series. The game is the second Call of Duty title since 2011's Call of Duty: Modern Warfare 3 to be co-developed by two studios.

Black Ops Cold Wars campaign is set during the early 1980s of the Cold War, taking place between Call of Duty: Black Ops (2010) and Call of Duty: Black Ops II (2012) chronologically. It is centered around a pursuit of the alleged Soviet spy Perseus, whose stated goal is to subvert the United States and tilt the balance of power toward the Soviet Union. For the campaign, the player takes control of "Bell", who is recruited by CIA officer Russell Adler into a multinational task force created to hunt down Perseus. The campaign also sees the return of Black Ops characters Alex Mason, Frank Woods, and Jason Hudson, with Mason also being the playable character in certain missions. The game's multiplayer introduced new game modes as well as new map dynamics and elements, carrying over several design choices introduced in Call of Duty: Modern Warfare. It features a seasonal content system similar to Modern Warfare, which includes a battle pass as well as free maps and weapons added every season. Cold War also features narrative tie-ins to Modern Warfare via the campaign and multiplayer, establishing a shared universe across multiple Call of Duty sub-series.

The game was originally developed by Raven and Sledgehammer Games and not intended to be an entry in the Black Ops subseries. However, the development suffered from disagreements among the two teams, resulting in Activision placing Treyarch in charge of the game's development in 2019, with Raven acting as a co-developer to them. Marketing for the game began in August 2020 and was done in different forms, including certain content creators receiving slide projectors, puzzles made to be solved online by fans, and a website showcasing historical Cold War events. A public multiplayer beta for the game was also made live in October 2020. Black Ops Cold War received generally favorable reviews from critics, with praise for the campaign, multiplayer, and zombies, while criticizing its technical issues and lack of innovation. It became the best-selling game of 2020 in the US.

Gameplay

Campaign
Call of Duty: Black Ops Cold War campaign allows players to assume a custom character, codenamed "Bell", with the ability to choose their intelligence agency, skin tone, nationality, and gender; as well as different personality traits that provide in-game perks. For the first time since Call of Duty: Black Ops II, the campaign features multiple endings, dependent on player choice throughout the campaign.

Multiplayer
Multiplayer features new and returning game modes, as well as maps that accommodate both the traditional 6v6 format, as well as larger 12v12 combat. The game also introduced a new game mode named "Fireteam", which can support up to 40 players. The Create-a-Class system from Modern Warfare returns, with two major differences: field upgrades are implemented as part of class loadouts, and each class has a wildcard choice out of four possible ones: Gunfighter (allows up to 8 primary weapon attachments), Perk Greed (allows 2 perks from each perk type for a total of 6 usable perks), Danger Close (double grenade equipment), or Lawbreaker (allows mixing and matching any weapon/perk type in any slot). Like Modern Warfare, Cold War also support cross-platform play and cross-platform progression. Following an update, the progression system for multiplayer is integrated with Call of Duty: Warzone, allowing for a unified level system across Cold War, Warzone  and Modern Warfare. In addition, Operator characters and weapons from Cold War are also added to Warzone to be used alongside Modern Warfare Operators and weapons, though the multiplayer modes remain separated and do not share Operators and weapons.

Zombies
Zombies features a new storyline titled "Dark Aether" which expands on the original Aether story, concluded in Black Ops 4, while also staying true to the main narrative of the campaign. Instead of playing as predefined characters, players can take on the role of Operator characters from Multiplayer, as part of a CIA response team codenamed "Requiem". Progression from Multiplayer is shared with Zombies, as players are able to use any weapon to start a Zombies match, alongside Gunsmith, scorestreaks and field upgrades, in addition to returning mechanics such as wallbuys, the Mystery Box, Pack-a-Punch and past fan-favorite Perks. For the first time in Zombies, players can opt to "exfil" the map, which will put them in a difficult wave with increased enemy spawn that they must survive before they can escape. Collectible intels are also scattered around the playable maps, allowing players to keep track of and unfold the main story as they progress. A skill upgrade system is featured in the game, allowing players to enhance weapons, perks, ammo mods and field upgrades with Aetherium Crystals, a currency acquired from reaching round milestones. A new game mode, Onslaught, was introduced exclusively to PlayStation players until November 1, 2021. In this mode, which are played within Multiplayer maps, up to 2 players defend areas grounded off by the Dark Aether orb, which must be powered by zombie kills. Sufficient kills will move the orb to new positions, forcing the players to move or die outside of the orb's protection zone. The Season Two update introduces "Outbreak", a large-scale mode where players fight off zombie hordes and complete objectives in an open-world area, composed of locations featured in the larger Multiplayer modes.

Plot

Characters and settings
Call of Duty: Black Ops Cold War is set during the Cold War in the early 1980s. The campaign follows Green Beret turned CIA SAD/SOG officer Russell Adler (Bruce Thomas) and his mission to stop an international espionage threat named Perseus (William Salyers) in 1981. The story is inspired by actual events and the campaign features locations such as East Berlin, Vietnam, Turkey, and the Soviet KGB headquarters. Adler is supported by returning Black Ops characters Alex Mason (Chris Payne Gilbert), Frank Woods (Damon Victor Allen) and Jason Hudson (Piotr Michael), alongside fellow MACV-SOG operative Lawrence Sims (Reggie Watkins), Mossad fixer Eleazar "Lazar" Azoulay (Damon Dayoub), and MI6 intelligence officer Helen Park (Lily Cowles), with additional support from KGB Head of Security and undercover agent Dimitri Belikov (Mark Ivanir). Players take on the role of "Bell", a mysterious operative who assists Adler and his team in finding Perseus for the majority of the campaign; Mason and Belikov are also playable in certain segments. Perseus' inner circle consists of: Iranian terrorists Arash Kadivar (Navid Negahban) and Qasim Javadi (Farshad Farahat), Russian mafia boss Anton Volkov (Rafael Petardi), rogue KGB Agent Major Vadim Rudnik and ex-CIA officer Robert Aldrich. The campaign also features a brief appearance by Imran Zakhaev (Dan Donohue), father of Call of Duty: Modern Warfare antagonist Victor Zakhaev, and Colonel Lev Kravchenko (Andrew Divoff), a former nemesis of Mason and Woods whom they last encountered in Vietnam.

The multiplayer mode's seasonal story takes place from late 1983 to 1984, and follows Adler on a new mission to investigate the resurgence of Perseus and his agents, led by Vikhor "Stitch" Kuzmin (Chris Parson), who seeks vengeance on Adler for personal reasons. Stitch's followers and fellow Perseus operatives include: Laotian warlord Kapano "Naga" Vang (Greg Chun), ex-NIS operative Freya "Wraith" Helvig, ex-MI6 agent Roman "Knight" Gray (Mark Sheppard), mercenary Owethu "Jackal" Mabuza (Gabe Kunda), ex-yakuza Kaori "Kitsune" Tanaka (Erika Ishii), and ex-Spanish Army demolitions expert Benito "Fuze" Ortega. Several NATO allies appear throughout the seasons assisting Adler and the CIA in fighting Stitch's forces, including: DGSE operative Zeyna Ossou (Mara Junot), SRT Marine Wyatt "Bulldozer" Jones (Jeff Schine), Delta Force sniper Terrell Wolf (Zeke Alton), guerrilla fighter Karla Rivas (Krizia Bajos), Unit 777 officer Jabari Salah (Ayman Samman), and CIA SAD operative Colton "Stryker" Greenfield (Christian Rummel). Captain Carver Butcher (Ron Bottitta), founder of Task Force Vanguard and a protagonist of the Call of Duty: Vanguard multiplayer seasonal story, makes an appearance in the final Cold War multiplayer season.

The Dark Aether story in Zombies mode takes place from late 1983 to 1985, and continues several narrative elements from its predecessor, the Aether story. The central protagonists of the story are Requiem, a classified CIA task force dedicated to studying and eradicating the global rising undead threat. Players take on the role of a four-person Strike Team, taking orders from CIA officer Grigori Weaver (Gene Farber), who coordinates Requiem's various operations. Other Requiem members include: Major Mackenzie Carver (Keston John), Head of Containment and Security Division; Doctor Elizabeth Grey (Amy Pemberton), Head of Unnatural Sciences; Doctor Oskar Strauss (Thure Riefenstein), Head of Energy Research; "Raptor One" (Derek Phillips), a pilot who is tasked with extracting the strike team from outbreak zones upon completion of their missions; and the enigmatic Director who monitors the strike team's activities. Opposing Requiem is Omega Group, a Soviet Union-backed organization lead by Colonel Kravchenko, who is largely responsible for the new undead outbreak threat. Through the course of the story, Requiem agents come into contact with Kravchenko and other Omega operatives, including: Doctor William Peck (Zeke Alton), an American scientist who betrayed the United States government to defect to Omega; Doctor Aleksandra Valentina (Sadie Alexandru), Lead Scientist in Psychotronics Research, whose secret identity is Angelika Vogel, daughter of Nazi scientist Ulrich Vogel (Michael Gough); Doctor Hugo Jager, Research Lead of Necro-Analytics department; and Commander Gorev (Zeke Alton), Kravchenko's right-hand man. Assisting Requiem in their battle against Omega Group and the undead are Samantha Maxis (Julie Nathanson), a former BND operative and acquaintance of Weaver with a mysterious past; and Sergei Ravenov (Andrew Morgado), an Omega Group soldier who lost faith in the organization's mission and acts as Maxis' mole. Both Requiem and Omega also regularly establish contact with Kazimir Zykov (Andrew Morgado), a Soviet engineer who is trapped in the Dark Aether dimension and wishes to escape with either group's help.

Synopsis

Campaign
In January 1981, CIA SAD/SOG operatives Russell Adler, Alex Mason, and Frank Woods are sent to target Qasim Javadi and Arash Kadivar for their roles in the Iran hostage crisis. With intelligence gained from interrogating Qasim, the team tracks Arash to Turkey, where the three witness him executing everyone in the vehicle he arrived in. Arash boasts that Perseus was the one responsible for organizing the hostage crisis before being executed. US President Ronald Reagan authorizes a black operation team to neutralize Perseus after being briefed of his threat by Jason Hudson and Adler.

Adler's team consists of CIA operative Lawrence Sims, American born Mossad operative Eleazar "Lazar" Azoulay, and MI6 intelligence officer Helen Park, with Mason and Woods providing tactical support. The final member of the team is an agent known only by the codename "Bell", who served with Adler and Sims in MACV-SOG during the Vietnam War. The team starts by asking Bell to recall Operation Fracture Jaw in 1968, where Adler believes he, Bell, and Sims first encountered Perseus. Afterwards, the team proceeds to East Berlin to apprehend/kill Anton Volkov, a Russian mafia boss with ties to Perseus.

Following an infiltration into a secret Spetsnaz training facility by Bell and Woods, the team discovers that Perseus had infiltrated Operation Greenlight, a top secret American program that secretly planted neutron bombs in every major European city to deny their use to the Soviets in the event of an invasion. Mason and Woods are deployed to Mount Yamantau in the Ural Mountains, where they infiltrate Nikita Dragovich's destroyed base in hopes of retrieving his list of sleeper agents. However, the team finds out that Perseus has wiped the data from the Yamantau base's mainframe, leaving their only option to infiltrate KGB Headquarters to retrieve the list. Enlisting the help of one of their KGB double agent allies, Dimitri Belikov, they manage to get Adler and Bell inside the Lubyanka Building. The team learns that an Operation Greenlight scientist is one of the sleeper agents and has fled to Cuba. Hoping to catch Perseus there, the team launches a raid. They learn that Perseus has managed to steal the detonation codes for every Operation Greenlight bomb, meaning he can devastate Europe and lay the blame on the United States. The team comes under heavy fire and Lazar and Park are injured in the process, leaving Bell only enough time to save one of them.

After rescuing Bell, Adler continues to press them by provoking their memories of Vietnam once more. At this point, Bell's true identity is revealed as an agent of Perseus, having been shot by Arash in Turkey out of jealousy. Bell was found by Adler and was brainwashed using Project MKUltra into believing they were his comrade. With Bell's memory returned, Adler interrogates them on the location of Perseus' headquarters. Bell can then either choose to remain loyal to Perseus and lie to Adler, or choose to betray Perseus and reveal his location.

 In the non-canonical endings where Bell chooses to stay loyal to Perseus, they lie by telling Adler to head to the Duga radar array, where the team will be too far away to stop Perseus from activating the nukes. If Bell has established contact with the Soviet Army beforehand, they will lure the team into a trap and kill them with the help of Perseus and the Soviet Army before they activate the nukes. If Bell refuses to kill the team, Bell is executed by Adler but the nukes will still go off. Europe is devastated by the explosions and public opinion of the United States plummets. The CIA is forced to erase the existence of Adler and his team in an effort to cover up the United States' involvement in Operation Greenlight. Perseus boasts that his agents in Europe will take advantage of the chaos to infiltrate every European government and turn them towards the Soviet Union, while his agents in the United States will continue to undermine the country.
 In the canonical ending where Bell decides to betray Perseus and help the CIA, they along with the team assault Perseus' headquarters in the Solovetsky Islands and destroy the transmitters needed to send the detonation signal. With the failure of Operation Greenlight, Perseus goes into hiding, though Adler swears to continue pursuing him and dismantle his spy network. Later, Adler takes Bell out for a private conversation, assuring them that their choice to turn against Perseus was of their own free will and that they are a hero. Adler then admits that Bell must be eliminated as a loose end and both draw their guns, with the scene fading to black as gunshots are heard.

Multiplayer/Warzone
Two years after Operation Greenlight's failure, a Perseus cell infiltrates the Cheyenne Mountain Complex and successfully hijacks a nuclear ICBM during military exercise Able Archer 83. Operators from NATO and Warsaw Pact countries are deployed to various hot zones, where Perseus activities are sighted. On January 20, 1984, a Perseus cell, led by Vikhor "Stitch" Kuzmin, raids a CIA safe house in West Berlin in order to gain intel on Adler. Stitch, who was in charge of Nova-6 production on Rebirth Island, vowed vengeance on Adler, who captured and tortured him during the CIA's assault on the island in 1968. Stitch leaves behind a message to taunt Adler that leads him to a mall in New Jersey. At the mall, Adler's team runs into an ambush by Stitch, who has also set up a cache of Nova-6. The team attempts to escape, but Adler is ultimately captured and taken away by Stitch and his men.

Three months later, Woods leads a squad to Laos where Adler was last sighted, only to learn that he has been transported to Verdansk. Hudson authorizes a search and rescue operation to retrieve Adler. On June 2, 1984, two Perseus operatives, Freya "Wraith" Helvig and Roman "Knight" Gray, infiltrate the Yamantau secret military base and retrieve data related to Dragovich's numbers program, which Stitch plans to use in order to create more sleeper agents across the nation. They then detonate the base, intending to shift the blame toward the U.S. and spark another war. Eight days later, Woods manages to locate Adler in Verdansk and rescue him.

Some times later, Stitch orders Perseus operative Owethu "Jackal" Mabuza to assault Jumpseat Satellite Ground Station in South Africa. The station's surviving specialist is forced to obey Stitch's order as he de-orbits two CIA satellites, which end up crashing in Verdansk and Algeria, respectively. Following his recovery, Adler immediately leads a squad to investigate the satellite crash in Algeria. As they approach the crash site, Adler recklessly charges in and eliminates Perseus agents, while secretly recovering a data recorder from the satellite debris. A month later, Woods leads a response team, accompanied by Colton "Stryker" Greenfield, to the ECHELON Listening Station in Teufelsburg, where they attempt to apprehend Perseus operative Kaori "Kitsune" Tanaka. Kitsune, who has just finished uploading the numbers protocol, activates the sequence, turning the response team against Woods and Stryker, who narrowly escape death. Afterwards, Hudson meets with Woods in private and reveals an inconsistency in Adler's statement about the data recorder from the Algeria satellite crash site, as well as his recent unmonitored activities in Verdansk. Recognizing that Adler may have been compromised due to the numbers program, Hudson orders Woods to contact Mason for help.

On August 2, 1984, Stitch and Perseus operative Benito "Fuze" Ortega attempt to defuse several explosive charges planted all across Verdansk by Adler. Meanwhile, Adler is put through extensive torture by Mason and Hudson in order to break his programming. Mason succeeds in deprogramming Adler, while Stitch's team fails to stop most of the charges from detonating. Woods, Adler, Mason and Hudson are deployed at a heavily destroyed Verdansk to confront Stitch for the final time. They eventually find Stitch in the woods, where Adler learns that he had taken over the mantle of Perseus, while the previous one passed away from cancer in 1983. Having finished his work, Stitch willingly surrenders his life, while taunting Adler of his actions. A gunshot is heard as the scene cuts to black.

A few days after, Adler, Mason, Woods and Hudson investigate an underground Nazi bunker in the ruins of Verdansk, where they meet Captain Carver Butcher, a retired Special Operations Executive agent and founder of Task Force Vanguard. Butcher begins telling Adler and the others of his mission in leading various special operations task forces to hunt down remnants of the Nazi empire in the Pacific.

Zombies
In 1983, CIA Special Officer Grigori Weaver is contacted by an acquaintance, former BND operative Samantha Maxis, who provides him with secret KGB intelligence. Weaver learns from Maxis that during World War II, the Nazis attempted an experiment in a secret bunker in Morasko, Poland where they managed to reanimate dead soldiers into zombies. Afterwards, the bunker was discovered and sealed by the Soviet Union, only to be recently uncovered by Omega Group, a KGB-Spetsnaz joint research team working in favor of the Soviet Union. As a result, several Dark Aether anomalies begin to appear around the world, unleashing zombies in their wake. A classified task force codenamed Requiem is assembled to combat the global undead threats as well as conduct research into the anomalies for technological advancement.

In November 1983, Requiem deploys a strike team to the bunker in Morasko, dubbed Projekt Endstation, where they discover a rift that acts as a gateway to the Dark Aether dimension, responsible for other global dimensional breaches. Upon further investigation, the strike team uncovers a device in the facility called Der Wechsler, which can restore a zombie's brain functionality. The strike team uses it on one of the roaming zombies in the facility, who was a former Omega Group member named Orlov. In turn, he agrees to help the team close the dimensional rift. Orlov successfully seals the rift, destroying Endstation and sacrificing himself in the process, while allowing the strike team to escape.

Following Endstation's destruction, Maxis investigates further into Omega Group's activities, and travels to Outpost 25, located in A Sầu Valley, Vietnam, but is captured by Omega forces and thrown into the Dark Aether dimension. In June 1984, the Requiem strike team arrives at Outpost 25, and makes contact with Captain Sergei Ravenov, Maxis' mole within Omega. Ravenov guides the strike team through the undead-infested facility, while also dealing with Doctor William Peck, an American scientist who defected to Omega. After learning from Peck of Maxis' current situation, the strike team attempts to open a portal and stabilize it long enough for Maxis to escape the dimension. They eventually succeed and exfiltrate with Maxis, while Ravenov elects to remain undercover as Omega continues their operations in the Ural Mountains. Following Requiem's success, Omega's leaders, Colonel Lev Kravchenko and Doctor Aleksandra Valentina, travel to Outpost 25 to confront Peck about his failure.

In an effort to catch up to Omega Group's progress, Requiem launches Operation Threshold, a large-scale mission across the Ural Mountains where the largest outbreak zones have been identified. Over the next several months, Requiem operators are deployed in multiple Ural regions in order to eliminate undead targets, capture specimen and commence further research on the mysterious Aetherium element. Meanwhile, Maxis is quarantined under isolation due to her time spent inside the Dark Aether dimension. In November 1984, Maxis secretly contacts the Requiem strike team during their mission, requesting them to meet with Ravenov. At the missile silo in Ruka, Ravenov reveals that Peck has been using Aetherium crystals to supercharge nuclear warheads, which would allow Omega Group to create new outbreak zones wherever they choose. Not wishing to let either side possess the warheads, Maxis instructs Ravenov and the strike team to work together and direct the warheads toward the Pacific Ocean where they can be safely dumped. After clearing out a massive zombie horde guarding the silo, the strike team succeeds in deploying the warheads and manages to exfil.

Afterwards, Ravenov contacts Weaver via Maxis' secret radio channel, and requests Requiem's help in extracting several Omega scientists who wish to defect from the group. Though angry at Ravenov and Maxis' secrecy, Weaver agrees to help him carry out the operation. Some times later, the strike team receives intel from Ravenov that he has lost contact with the scientists. The team is sent to the State Sanatorium U-23 to investigate a crash site and help extract the scientists; however, they were all murdered by Doctor Hugo Jager, an Omega scientist who was secretly a mole planted by Kravchenko to root out the defectors. The strike team attempts to exfil, but is captured by Kravchenko and Omega forces.

Amidst the operations at the Ural Mountains, both Requiem and Omega come into contact with Kazimir Zykov, a Soviet engineer who was originally sent to the Endstation bunker in 1945 to shut it down, and has been trapped inside the Dark Aether since then. Zykov, who wishes to escape the dimension, has attempted to reach out to the real world, giving both Requiem and Omega warnings of a mysterious entity commanding the undead forces from within. Meanwhile, Valentina continues to further her own agenda: to open a gateway to the Dark Aether in hopes of freeing her father, who seemingly has been communicating with her from the other side since her childhood. Omega Group eventually deduces Valentina's real identity as the daughter of Ulrich Vogel, a Nazi scientist who previously lead Projekt Endstation.

Two months after the strike team's capture, an outbreak occurs in East Berlin, where Valentina was last sighted. Having learned of her true allegiance, Kravchenko decides to deploy the Requiem strike team at the Berlin site to stop her, while overseeing their mission. Upon arriving in Berlin, Kravchenko and the strike team learn that Valentina has been mutated with Dark Aether energy by the Forsaken, the entity mentioned by Zykov, who was also masquerading as Vogel to trick Valentina into doing his bidding. The strike team reaches an abandoned CIA safehouse and reactivates Klaus, a combat robot customized with an artificial intelligence module created by the Director of Requiem. With Omega Group's instructions, the team constructs a miniature Aetherium warhead using components left onsite by the CIA. Valentina attempts to stop them, but is ultimately defeated, and her energy is used to refine the Aetherium for the warhead. As the Forsaken taunts Requiem of his imminent arrival, Klaus carries the warhead through the portal to complete the mission. Kravchenko attempts to betray the strike team at the last minute, but Maxis, using her Dark Aether power, manages to open a portal, allowing the team to return home safely. Meanwhile, the Director monitors Maxis, and sends a group memo to an unknown recipient, noting her growing power as a concern toward Project Janus.

As Operation Threshold expands into the North Atlantic Sea and Algeria, the Director continues to pressure Maxis in isolation, coercing her into using her powers. Meanwhile, Omega Group authorizes a new operation to free Zykov from the Dark Aether, intending to use this opportunity to take down the Forsaken with their own warheads. Requiem, after receiving intel on Omega's new operation from Ravenov, also intends to free Zykov by their own means. On June 4, 1985, the Requiem strike team is deployed to an Omega test site in Ukraine, where Kravchenko and Peck are conducting the final steps to open a Dark Aether gateway. They succeed in freeing Zykov, only to learn that he was the Forsaken all along. As Kravchenko and Peck attempt to escape the facility, Maxis and the strike team make their final stand against the Forsaken. Eventually, Maxis sacrifices herself by plunging into a Dark Aether portal, weakening the Forsaken enough for him to be captured by Omega's containment chamber. With the Forsaken defeated, all global outbreak zones are collapsed, and the undead threat is contained. The Director - revealed to be Edward "Eddie" Richtofen - orders Requiem to be shut down, and its department leads apprehended alongside the strike team, while the Forsaken's chamber is delivered to an unknown location. Five years later, Peck travels to Japan and charters a boat to the middle of the Pacific Ocean, claiming that he is looking for "some old friends".

Development 
On May 18, 2019, Kotaku reported that the game was in upheaval as developers Sledgehammer Games and Raven Software had increasing tensions between the studios. Two sources described the game as a "mess". In response, Activision assigned Treyarch to lead development alongside Raven. This led to a shorter development period compared to previous entries as well as the two studios having different responsibilities, with Raven Software leading the development of the single-player campaign.

On August 4, 2020, Activision in their Q2 earnings call confirmed that a new Call of Duty title was planned to be released in 2020 and that Treyarch and Raven were developing the game. It is the first Call of Duty game since Modern Warfare 3 to be co-developed by two studios, as well as the first time Raven Software is a main developer, as in previous games they assisted on the multiplayer and extra features. Activision president Rob Kostich confirmed during the Q2 earnings call that Black Ops Cold War will be "tightly connected" to Call of Duty: Modern Warfare (2019) and Call of Duty: Warzone.

Raven Software's Dan Vondrak said on the idea of multiple endings, "when we started creating the story, we had multiple endings in mind right away. And that really helped ... But we knew right away that we wanted to do that. I absolutely loved the idea that we could [have a] little bit of homage to Black Ops 2 by having these [multiple endings]."

Marketing 
Announcements and marketing relating to a Call of Duty game have traditionally been around April or May prior to the game's fall release. However, Activision began teasing the game with an alternate reality game (ARG) in August 2020. Various YouTubers prevalent to the Call of Duty community on YouTube were shipped crates. Once authorized to open on August 10, 2020, they were greeted by a slide projector, 10 different slides per crate, and a manifest. Starting on August 14, 2020, the game was marketed, after initial ciphers solved, by enticing fans to solve ciphers and puzzles on pawntakespawn.com. The website allowed fans to watch VHS tapes containing news segments and footage that pertained to the corresponding year(s) throughout the Cold War. Throughout the VHS tapes, at random intervals, two-digit nixie tube combinations appeared, required to solve ciphers, in addition to one set of coordinates per VHS tape that led to a location in Warzone.

On August 19, 2020, once all ciphers were solved, the teaser trailer was revealed. The teaser trailer contains segments of a 1984 interview with former Soviet PGU KGB informant and defector Yuri Bezmenov discussing active measures, taken from a 1984 interview with conspiracy theorist G. Edward Griffin. The worldwide reveal was on August 26, 2020.

Starting on September 22, 2020, another alternate reality game (ARG) on pawntakespawn.com, teasing the Zombies mode, began when various Call of Duty YouTubers such as NoahJ456 and MrDalekJD were sent crates with 1980s technology and ciphers to solve. The official reveal for Zombies was on September 30.

Pre-orders of all Black Ops Cold War editions grant early access to the open-access beta, a weapons pack, and a Frank Woods operator pack in Call of Duty: Modern Warfare and Call of Duty: Warzone. The Ultimate Edition grants access to three additional cosmetic skin packs, plus access to the Battle Pass of the current Season for Black Ops Cold War (dependent on time of purchase). The Cross-gen Bundle and Ultimate Edition grant console players two versions of the game for use on the current console generation (PlayStation 4 and Xbox One) and the next generation (PlayStation 5 and Xbox Series S or Xbox Series X) upon availability.

Controversies 

CBR.com reported that the teaser trailer had been banned in China due to a one-second depiction of the 1989 Tiananmen Square protests. An edited teaser was released worldwide instead. PC Gamer's Andy Chalk wrote: "There's also no mistaking the irony of active censorship in a promo trailer for a game whose tagline is, literally, 'Know your history'."

An editorial by Ian Walker in Kotaku accused Call of Duty of legitimating the views of Bezmenov when it included footage of his interview with Griffin in its August trailer. Among the complaints he had was that Bezmenov's views acted as a magnet for far-right conspiracy theories and personalities, that Activision presented Bezmenov's interview without the proper context and that Bezmenov himself held views that Walker argued were on the far right.

Post-launch content 
All downloadable content (DLC) maps for the game, both for multiplayer and Zombies, were completely free. As with Modern Warfare, the game features post-launch microtranscations via the battle pass system and cosmetic bundles available via the in-game store.

In May 2021, for the mid-season update of Season 3, Activision and Treyarch announced a collaboration event, titled "'80s Action Heroes", featuring the addition of John Rambo and John McClane as playable characters, as well as new limited-time game modes inspired by the Rambo franchise and the Die Hard film series. Rambo and McClane's appearances are based on Rambo: First Blood Part II and Die Hard, respectively, with their voice lines adapted directly from the films.

In September 2021, Activision and Rebellion Developments announced a collaboration, bringing the character Judge Dredd of the 2000 AD comic book series into Cold War as a cosmetic outfit for the operator Ingo Beck. The Judge Dredd bundle was released September 14, 2021.

In October 2021, Activision and Treyarch announced The Haunting seasonal event as part of its sixth season content update, which would feature game modes and purchasable cosmetic items based on several horror movie franchises. Ahead of the event's release, details were leaked about some of the items, including a Ghostface operator character based on the Scream franchise, as well as a Frank the Bunny outfit based on the character from Donnie Darko.

Reception 

Call of Duty: Black Ops Cold War received "generally favorable" reviews from critics, according to review aggregator Metacritic.

Game Informer gave the game a 8.75/10 rating, praising the campaign and saying: "If Call of Duty: Black Ops Cold War excels at anything, it's options. This isn't uncommon for a Call of Duty title, but with a vast array of game modes for myriad player profiles and a fun campaign that retains a summer-blockbuster feel while getting weird and wild, the ride is a good one."

Sales

The PlayStation 4 version sold 84,475 physical copies within its first week on sale in Japan, making it the bestselling retail game of the week in the country. The PlayStation 5 version was the nineteenth bestselling retail game in Japan throughout the same week, with 6,045 copies being sold. In December 2020, it was confirmed that the game had sold 5.7 million digital units. Within its first six weeks of release, the game earned $678 million. The NPD Group named it the best selling game of 2020 and also ranked it as the twentieth bestselling video game in the United States by lifetime dollar sales by the end of 2020.

Notes

References

External links 
 Official website

2020 video games
Activision games
Advertising and marketing controversies
Angolan Civil War video games
Alternate history video games
Call of Duty
Cold War video games
Cultural depictions of Mikhail Gorbachev
Cultural depictions of Ronald Reagan
Interquel video games
Multiplayer and single-player video games
PlayStation 4 games
PlayStation 5 games
Political video games
Raven Software games
Treyarch games
Video game sequels
Video games set in 1968
Video games set in 1981
Video games set in the 1980s
Video games set in Angola
Video games set in Cuba
Video games set in Germany
Video games set in East Germany
Video games set in Turkey
Video games set in Vietnam
Video games set in Los Angeles
Video games set in Moscow
Video games set in Miami
Video games set in Nevada
Video games set in New Jersey
Video games set in the Netherlands
Video games set in Ukraine
Video games set in Uzbekistan
Video games set in Berlin
Video games set in the Soviet Union
Video games set in Poland
Video games set in Nicaragua
Video games set in Laos
Video games set in New Mexico
Video games set in Kyrgyzstan
Video games set in Algeria
Video games set in Georgia (U.S. state)
Video games set in Panama
Video games set in Nebraska
Spy video games
Vietnam War video games
War video games set in the United States
Video games with alternate endings
World War III video games
Video games about nuclear war and weapons
Video games featuring protagonists of selectable gender
Windows games
Xbox One games
Xbox Series X and Series S games
Video games about zombies
Video games containing battle passes
Works about the Russian Mafia
Video games developed in the United States